Andreas Seppi was the defending champion but lost in the second round to Matthias Bachinger.

Daniel Masur won the title after defeating Bachinger 6–3, 6–7(8–10), 7–5 in the final.

Seeds

Draw

Finals

Top half

Bottom half

References

External links
Main draw
Qualifying draw

Biella Challenger Indoor IV - 1